Rudawka may refer to the following places in Poland:
Rudawka, Augustów County in Podlaskie Voivodeship (north-east Poland)
Rudawka, Sejny County in Podlaskie Voivodeship (north-east Poland)
Rudawka, Sokółka County in Podlaskie Voivodeship (north-east Poland)
Rudawka, Subcarpathian Voivodeship (south-east Poland)